Gymnopedie may refer to:
Gymnopaedia, a festival or dance in ancient Greece
Gymnopédies, a series of three compositions by French composer Erik Satie
Gymnopedies, a series of three compositions by Australian-American composer Peggy Glanville Hicks